Rudolf Müller (June 24, 1931 – December 25, 2012) was the Roman Catholic bishop of the Roman Catholic Diocese of Görlitz, Germany.

Ordained to the priesthood in 1955, Müller was named bishop in 1987 and retired in 2006.

Notes

Roman Catholic bishops of Görlitz
1931 births
2012 deaths